Pseudohypoparathyroidism is a condition associated primarily with resistance to the parathyroid hormone. Those with the condition have a low serum calcium and high phosphate, but the parathyroid hormone level (PTH) is appropriately high (due to the low level of calcium in the blood). Its pathogenesis has been linked to dysfunctional G Proteins (in particular, Gs alpha subunit). Pseudohypoparathyroidism is a very rare disorder, with estimated prevalence between 0.3 and 1.1 cases per 100000 population depending on geographic location.

Types

Types include:

Type 1a (OMIM )
 Has a characteristic phenotypic appearance (Albright's hereditary osteodystrophy), including short fourth and fifth metacarpals and a rounded facies. It is most likely an autosomal dominant disorder. It is also associated with thyroid stimulating hormone resistance. Caused by GNAS1 mutation.
 Type 1b (OMIM )
 Lacks the physical appearance of type 1a, but is biochemically similar. It is associated with a methylation defect in the A/B exon of GNAS1, caused by STX16 disruption.
 Type 2 (OMIM )
 Also lacks the physical appearance of type 1a. Since the genetic defect in type 2 is further down the signalling pathway than in type 1, there is a normal cAMP response to PTH stimulation despite the inherent abnormality in calcium regulation. The specific gene is not identified.

While biochemically similar, type 1 and 2 disease may be distinguished by the differing urinary excretion of cyclic AMP in response to exogenous PTH.

Some sources also refer to a "type 1c" (OMIM ). The phenotype is the same as in type 1a, but red blood cells show normal Gs activity. As it is also caused by a GNAS mutation, it is not clear whether it should be considered an entity separate from Ia.

Presentation
Patients may present with features of hypocalcaemia including carpo-pedal muscular spasms, cramping, tetany, and if the calcium deficit is severe, generalized seizures. IQ is typically mildly depressed or unaffected. Additional characteristics include short stature, obesity, developmental delay, and calcification of the basal ganglia in the deep white matter of the brain.

Type 1a Pseudohypoparathyroidism is clinically manifest by bone resorption with blunting of the fourth and fifth knuckles of the hand, most notable when the dorsum of the hand is viewed in closed fist position. This presentation is known as 'knuckle knuckle dimple dimple' sign (Archibald's sign). This is as opposed to Turner syndrome which is characterized by blunting of only the fourth knuckle, and Down syndrome, which is associated with a hypoplastic middle phalanx.

Related conditions
The term pseudopseudohypoparathyroidism is used to describe a condition where the individual has the phenotypic appearance of pseudohypoparathyroidism type 1a, but is biochemically normal.

Diagnosis

Biochemical findings
 hypocalcemia
 hyperphosphatemia
 elevated parathyroid hormone (hyperparathyroidism)
 Suppressed calcitriol levels

Treatment
Calcium and Calcitriol supplements, the latter with a larger dose than for treatment of hypoparathyroidism.

See also
 Hypoparathyroidism
 Pseudopseudohypoparathyroidism
 Hyperparathyroidism
 Rickets
 Hypervitaminosis D

References

Further reading

External links 

Cell surface receptor deficiencies
Rare diseases